Carey is a given name. Notable people with the name include:

Carey Bell (1936–2007), American blues musician
Carey Blyton (1932–2002), British composer
Carey Cavanaugh (born 1955), former U.S. Ambassador/peace mediator
Carey Davis (born 1981), former American football fullback
Carey Foster (1835–1919), a chemist and physicist
Carey Harrison (born 1944), English novelist and dramatist
Carey Hart (born 1975), American former professional freestyle motocross competitor
Carey W. Hayes (born 1961), American screenwriter and producer
Carey Lohrenz (born 1968), former lieutenant
Carey Lowell (born 1961), American actress
Carey McWilliams (journalist) (1905–1980), American journalist and lawyer
Carey McWilliams (marksman) (born 1973), blind marksman, author, and skydiver
Carey Mercer (born 1975), Canadian musician
Carey D. Miller (1895–1985), American food scientist
Carey Mulligan (born 1985), English actress
Carey Loftin (1914–1997), American professional stuntman, stunt coordinator and actor
Carey Orr (1890–1967), American editorial cartoonist
Carey Price (born 1987), Canadian professional hockey player
Carey Schueler (born 1974), The daughter of former Chicago White Sox General Manager Ron Schueler
Carey Wilber (1916–1998), journalist and television writer
Carey Wilson (ice hockey) (born 1962), Canadian ice hockey centre
Carey Wilson (writer) (1889–1962), American screenwriter, voice actor, and producer

Fictional characters
Carey Martin, in the Disney Channel sitcoms The Suite Life of Zack & Cody and The Suite Life on Deck

See also

Carry (name)
Karey (disambiguation)